The Max Planck Institute of Molecular Physiology is located in Dortmund, next to the Dortmund University of Technology. It is one of 80 institutes in the Max Planck Society (Max Planck Gesellschaft).

Origins
The Institute was originally founded by Max Rubner as the Kaiser-Wilhelm Institut für Arbeitsphysiologie, part of the  Kaiser Wilhelm Institute in 1913. During the First World War the Institute focussed on nutrition and diet, and how ersatz substitutes could be found for particular foodstuffs which were becoming scarce. They worked alongside the Kriegsernährungsamt  (War Nutrition Office) to try out different food surrogates both for the military and the civilian population. They also developed aptitude tests for different types of work, such as evaluating distance perception for military drivers, pilots and railway workers. This was further developed to provide a means for selecting artillery officers.

Departments

Mechanistic Cell Biology
The Department of Mechanistic Cell Biology aims to better understand the molecular mechanisms of cell division and their regulation. The main focus is on the key proteins that control the division of chromosomes during mitosis, a process that separates sister chromatids into two identical daughter cells, thereby maintaining chromosome stability.

Systemic Cell Biology
The Department of Systemic Cell Biology studies the regulation of signal transduction processes in cells. These processes control significant cellular functions such as tissue growth (proliferation) or the differentiation of cells into specialized cell types and, thus, determine the fate of each cell.

Structural Biochemistry
The Department of Structural Biochemistry focuses on structural and functional analyses of biologically and medically relevant membrane proteins and macromolecular complexes. Special attention is given to the investigation into the molecular mechanisms of muscle contraction and the infection with bacterial toxins. Furthermore, membrane proteins that play an important role in the synthesis, transport, and homeostasis of cholesterol in the body are examined.

Chemical Biology
Research in the Department of Chemical Biology concentrates on the interface between organic chemistry and biology. By using biochemical and chemical techniques, researchers identify and develop new tools for the investigation of biologically relevant processes and phenomena.

References

External links 
 Chemical Genomics Centre (CGC)
 Official site Federation European Physiological Societies
 Official site European Federation for Pharmaceutical Sciences
 Official site European Federation for Medicinal Chemistry
 Official site Federation of European Biochemical Societies

Molecular Physiology
Molecular biology institutes